Daniel Edusei (born 2 September 1980) is a Ghanaian former professional footballerwho played as a defender. He represented the Ghana national team between 1998 and 2006.

Career
Edusei was born in Kumasi. He signed a five-year contract with Egaleo in summer 2002. He played a season in Beta Ethniki before left for Ethnikos Achna in summer 2008.

References

External links
 
 
 

Living people
1980 births
Footballers from Kumasi
Association football defenders
Ghanaian footballers
Ghanaian expatriate footballers
Ghana international footballers
1998 African Cup of Nations players
2006 Africa Cup of Nations players
Cypriot First Division players
Ethnikos Achna FC players
Athinaikos F.C. players
Egaleo F.C. players
Ethnikos Asteras F.C. players
Expatriate footballers in Cyprus
Ghanaian expatriate sportspeople in Cyprus
Expatriate footballers in Greece
Ghapoha Readers players